Shadrack Nsajigwa (born 10 February 1984) is a retired Tanzanian footballer who played club football for Young Africans FC and international football for Tanzania.

International goals

References

1984 births
Living people
Tanzanian footballers
Tanzania international footballers
Prisons F.C. players
Young Africans S.C. players
Saraswoti Youth Club players
Association football defenders
Tanzanian expatriate footballers
Expatriate footballers in Nepal
Tanzanian expatriate sportspeople in Nepal
Tanzanian Premier League players
Tanzania A' international footballers
2009 African Nations Championship players